Partisans of National Liberation of Afghanistan or Front of Nimruz was founded in 1979 in Nimruz province of Afghanistan by Abdul Karim Brahui and Gul Mohammad Rahimi.

It was a Baloch nationalist guerrilla group, representing the Baloch people of southwestern Afghanistan.

See also
 Balochistan

References

External links
Albert J. Jongman, Alex Peter Schmid. Political Terrorism: A New Guide to Actors, Authors, Concepts, Data Bases, Theories, & Literature. Transaction Publishers, 2005. ,  

Anti-Soviet factions in the Soviet–Afghan War
Baloch nationalist militant groups
Balochistan
History of Nimruz Province
National liberation armies
National liberation movements
Paramilitary organisations based in Afghanistan
Rebel groups in Afghanistan